Fukyugata is the name of a kata practiced in many styles of Okinawan karate, particularly in the Matsubayashi-ryu school of Shorin-ryu, as well as Goju-ryu, where they are termed Gekisai.

Variations 
There are two versions of Fukyugata:
 Shoshin Nagamine (Matsubayashi-ryu) created Fukyugata Ichi
 Chojun Miyagi (Goju-ryu) created Fukyugata Ni, or Gekisai Dai Ichi

Both were developed as beginner kata because the more traditional kata were seen to be too difficult for beginners. These two kata were commissioned by the special committee of Okinawan Karate-do under Mr. Gen Hayakawa, then governor of the Okinawa Prefecture in 1940. The kata were finished and introduced in 1941 in order to promote a basic and standard kata across a majority of Okinawan Karate styles, however only some styles continue to practice both, or one of these kata.

There are two additional versions with limited acceptance, both described as the "third" Fukyugata:
 A Fukyugata (Sandan) composed by Sensei Ansei Ueshiro in 1960, consisting of 17 movements; this kata was never adopted in Okinawa Prefecture, and is considered to be a copy of Ananku kata.

See also 
 Karate kata

References

Bibliography

External links 
 Shugyokan Shorin Ryu Dojo

Karate kata